Jacqueline Hansen (born November 20, 1948) is a former long-distance runner from the United States who is recognized by the International Association of Athletics Federations as having set a world best in the marathon on two occasions.

Biography
Hansen set a world best mark on December 1, 1974, with a 2:43:55 performance at the Western Hemisphere Marathon in Culver City, California, then recaptured it from Christa Vahlensieck of West Germany on October 12, 1975, with 2:38:19 at the Nike OTC Marathon in Eugene, Oregon. With these two performances, she was ranked first in women's marathon for 1974 and 1975.

Hansen won 12 of her first 15 marathons. Among these victories, she won the prestigious Boston Marathon in 1973, the Honolulu Marathon in 1975, and the Avenue of the Giants Marathon in 1976. Hansen is also a three-time winner of the Western Hemisphere Marathon (1972, 1974, 1977) and the Catalina Marathon (1979, 1981, 1982).

At the 1987 World Masters Athletics Championships in Melbourne, Australia, Hansen won titles in the 1,500 meters and the 5,000 meters.

Hansen was the president of a group, the International Runners Committee, that successfully lobbied the International Olympic Committee to add women's events for the 5,000 meters, the 10,000 meters, and the marathon.

Hansen was a member of the Los Angeles Track Club, 1970-1972; Southern California Striders, 1973-1974; San Fernando Valley Track Club, 1974-1983 & 1987-1993; and Oregon Track Club 1983-1987.  After her competitive running career, Hansen worked for the Amateur Athletic Foundation of Los Angeles, and coached an all women's running team called "See Jane Run" (later known as "The Janes") to multiple USA Cross Country Championships.

Hansen attended Granada Hills High School and Los Angeles Pierce College, and is a 1974 graduate of California State University, Northridge.

Achievements
All results regarding marathon, unless stated otherwise

Honors and Organizations
1976  Race Director, Women's National AAU Marathon Championships, Western Hemisphere, Culver City, CA.
1977  Race Director, Women's National AAU 10K Road Race Championships, Bonne Belle 10K, Beverly Hills, CA.
1979-1981  Women’s SPA-AAU & SPA-TAC Long-Distance Running Chair.
1979-1980  Athletes’ Representative to Executive Board, The Athletics Congress (TAC-USA).
1979-1986  Former President, Executive Director, International Runners’ Committee.
1980  Advisory Board Member, American Running & Fitness Association.
1980-1987  Member, Road Runners Club of America Women’s Distance Committee.
1981-1990  Board of Directors, American Road Racing Association.
1984  Event Coordinator, Exhibition Women's 5,000m & 10,000m, USA Olympic Track & Field Trials, Los Angeles, CA.
1984  Athletes’ Representative to International Amateur Athletic Federation (IAAF) Cross-Country & Road Racing Committee.
1984  American Civil Liberties Union (ACLU) of Southern California, Annual Award for Leadership.
1984  Road Runners Club of America (RRCA), Hall of Fame Inductee.
1984  The Athletics Congress-USA Annual Recognition Award, “Woman of the Year”.
1984  Chairwoman, International Competition Subcommittee of TAC-USA Women’s Long Distance Running Committee (WLDRC).
1986, 1987, 1989  USA Team Manager, International Women's Ekiden, Yokohama, Japan.
1987  USA Head Coach, Women's Marathon Team, Taipei International Marathon, Taiwan.
1988  USA Team Leader, IAAF Women's International 15K Championships, Monte Carlo, Monaco.
1988  Athletic Hall of Fame Inductee, California State University, Northridge.
1988-1991  TAC-USA, WLDRC Site Selection Sub-Committee Chairwoman for the 1992 Women’s Olympic Marathon Trials.
1989-1991  TAC-Southern California Association WLDR Chairwoman.
1990-1991  TAC-SCA Board of Directors, Vice President.
1997  L.A. Pierce College’s “50 Distinguished Alumni” for celebration of Pierce’s 50th Anniversary.
1999 USA Team Head Coach, Women's & Men's Team, International Ekiden, Chiba, Japan.
2004  Lifetime Achievement Award, Southern California Association-USATF.

Notes

References

External links
Biography at KidsRunning.Com
Lifetime Achievement Award from USA Track & Field Southern California
Jacqueline Hansen's website

Living people
1948 births
American female marathon runners
World record setters in athletics (track and field)
Boston Marathon female winners
Track and field athletes from California
21st-century American women
20th-century American women